Ruslan Tamerlanovich Dzutsev (born 31 March 1984) is a former Russian football player.

He represented Russia at the 2001 UEFA European Under-16 Championship.

External links
 

1984 births
Living people
Russian footballers
FC Spartak Vladikavkaz players
Russian Premier League players
Association football forwards